Woodward Inn, also known as the Stagecoach Inn, is a historic inn and tavern located at Haines Township, Centre County, Pennsylvania.  It was built in 1814, and is a 2 1/2-story, five bay, stone building measuring 45 feet by 35 feet. It has a two-story frame extension all along the back of the stone building. The interior has a center hall plan in the Georgian style. The front facade features twin entrances, typical of early tavern construction.

It was added to the National Register of Historic Places in 1978.

References

Hotel buildings on the National Register of Historic Places in Pennsylvania
Georgian architecture in Pennsylvania
Hotel buildings completed in 1814
Commercial buildings completed in 1814
Houses in Centre County, Pennsylvania
National Register of Historic Places in Centre County, Pennsylvania